Interferon regulatory factor 2 is a protein that in humans is encoded by the IRF2 gene.

Function 

IRF2 encodes interferon regulatory factor 2, a member of the interferon regulatory transcription factor (IRF) family. IRF2 competitively inhibits the IRF1-mediated transcriptional activation of interferons alpha and beta, and presumably other genes that employ IRF1 for transcription activation. However, IRF2 also functions as a transcriptional activator of histone H4.

See also 
IRF1
Interferon regulatory factors

Interactions 

IRF2 has been shown to interact with BRD7, EP300 and PCAF.

References

Further reading

External links

Transcription factors